The First International Pageant of Pulchritude and Seventh Annual Bathing Girl Revue, was a beauty pageant held from May 15 to 17, 1926, in Galveston, Texas. The previous editions of the Galveston Bathing Girl Revue had only featured contestants from the United States. However, during the 1926 event, one contestant from Mexico and another from Canada entered, giving the pageant its first international competitors. It was reported that around 160,000 people watched the bathing costume parade on the afternoon of the 16th.

Miss Dallas, Catherine Moylan, won the event, becoming the first Beauty Queen of the Universe.

Events

The contestants began to arrive in Galveston on May 13. Señorita Mexico Maria Martha Perres and Miss Winnipeg Patricia O'Shea, both international entries, notably arrived on that first day, amid a crowd of curious onlookers. The opening parade was held on May 15, with the pageant itself held on May 16. The prizes were given out at the American Beauty Ball, held at the Garden of Tokio in Galveston, which was accompanied by music from various bands such as the Missouri Pacific band, and the Southern Pacific band.

Results

Miss Dallas, Catherine Moylan, won first place in the pageant and was crowned Beauty Queen of the Universe. It was the second time in a row that Miss Dallas won the competition. For winning, Moylan received $2000, and a gold and silver plaque engraved with "Beauty Queen of the Universe". After the competition, Moylan had revealed in an interview that she would use the prize money to attend Southern Methodist University in Dallas. She also gave credit to Dorothy Stahl, her coach, for her win.

The second-place winner received $1000, the third $250, and the remaining nine places received $100 each.

Judging was based on "beauty, form, grace, and personal charm." Costumes, props, and other decorations were not considered.

Placements

Delegates

Thirty-nine women entered the contest in 1926, with most coming from Texas and its surrounding states. The presence of contestants Maria Martha Parres from Mexico and Patricia O'Shea from Winnipeg, Manitoba, Canada, made the competition Galveston's first international event.

Contestants

 Señorita Mexico - Maria Martha Parres
 Miss Winnipeg - Patricia O'Shea
 Miss Jefferson County - Dorothy Burnham
 Miss Nebraska - Grace Tolsen
 Miss Tarrant County  - Gladys Bullock
 Miss Wichita County - Frances Oden
 Miss Beaumont - Estelle Johnston
 Miss Brownsville - Mary Stillwell
 Miss Caddo -  Jacquetta Calvin
 Miss Cane River Lake - Louella Porter
 Miss Cleveland - Constance Martin
 Miss Dallas - Catherine Moylan
 Miss Ellington Field - Margie Collins
 Miss Fort Worth - Vivian Cayce

 Miss Groesbeck - Lois Ford
 Miss Houston - Karen Hall
 Miss Jefferson City - Evelyn Manchester
 Miss Monroe - Mary Mcvay
 Miss Natchitoches - Peggy O'Neil
 Miss New Orleans - Gladys Moore
 Miss Palestine - Arylie Mae Hiser
 Miss Port Arthur - Beatrice Smith
 Miss San Antonio - Lola Beazley
 Miss Shreveport - Pauline Zacharias
 Miss Tulsa - Pauline Mason
 Miss Waco - Maurice Reed
 Miss Wichita Falls - Frances Rutledge

 Barbara Brewer - Dallas
 Clyde McConathy - Beaumont
 Elalu Watts - Dallas
 Freddie Mae Henkel - Dallas
 Grace Weber - Houston
 Lola Bernhardt - Beaumont 
 Lorraine Gazzaway - Dallas
 Lulu Buchanan - Houston
 Maiden Maxwell - Dallas
 Marie Evans - Dallas
 Pearl Flint - Dallas
 Rosebud Blondell - Dallas

References

International Pageant of Pulchritude
1926 in Texas
1926 beauty pageants